Major General Alan Cathcart, 6th Earl Cathcart  (22 August 1919 – 15 June 1999), styled Lord Greenock until 1927, was a British Army officer who served as Commandant of the British Sector in Berlin from 1970 until his retirement in 1973.

Military career
The only child of George Cathcart, 5th Earl Cathcart and Vera, Countess Cathcart, Alan was educated at Eton College and Magdelene College, Cambridge, Cathcart was commissioned into the Scots Guards in 1939.

He served in the Second World War and went on to be Adjutant at the Royal Military Academy Sandhurst after the war. He was made Adjutant of the Scots Guards in 1951 and Brigade Major for 4th Guards Brigade in 1954. He then went on to be Commanding Officer of 1st Battalion Scots Guards in 1957.

He was posted to Scottish Command in 1962 and became Commander of 152nd Infantry Brigade in 1965. He next transferred to the Operations Division of Supreme Headquarters Allied Powers Europe in 1967 and then became General Officer Commanding Yorkshire District in 1969. Finally he was appointed Commandant of the British Sector in Berlin in 1970: he retired in 1973.

In retirement from the British Army he became a Deputy Speaker of the House of Lords.

Family
In 1946 he married Rosemary Clare Marie Gabrielle Smyth-Osborne: they went on to have one son and two daughters. Following the death of his first wife, he married Marie Isobel Weldon in 1984.

References

External links

 

|-

1919 births
1999 deaths
People educated at Eton College
Alumni of Magdalene College, Cambridge
Companions of the Order of the Bath
Companions of the Distinguished Service Order
Recipients of the Military Cross
British Army major generals
Scots Guards officers
British Army personnel of World War II
Academics of the Royal Military Academy Sandhurst
Earls in the Peerage of the United Kingdom